Nicholas Edward O'Malley (born 5 July 1985) is an English musician, best known as the bass guitarist and backing vocalist of English band Arctic Monkeys.

Career

Career beginnings
O'Malley states that he picked up the bass guitar at the age of 16, after ambitions to play the drums and guitar were rejected by his father. Before joining Arctic Monkeys, O'Malley played the bass guitar in local garage rock band The Dodgems.

Arctic Monkeys
O'Malley was drafted in as a temporary replacement for bassist Andy Nicholson when the latter announced he would not make the band's North America tour in May 2006, while working at Asda. O'Malley says that he learned the whole of the band's debut album in two days of intensive play where he "pretty much didn't even leave the house". His first recordings with the band were on their non-album single "Leave Before the Lights Come On", in which he played bass guitar.

His first appearance with the band came on 25 May, when the band played a secret gig at the Old Blue Last pub in east London. The 120 capacity venue was seen as an opportunity for O'Malley to have a test run before the band's first North American gig in Vancouver on 27 May and festival dates in front of fifteen to twenty thousand people.

O'Malley broke his hand following some drunken antics with his former Dodgems bandmates only a week after agreeing to fill in for Nicholson—"As we were walking home from the pub, our roadie (Adam Guest) grabbed him (O'Malley) and pulled him over our neighbour's wall. It's quite high and he landed on his right hand." Dodgems singer Phillip Goodwin was quoted as saying on Angry Ape.  However, despite being his plectrum-hand he was still able to play the bass and joined the band in the successful tour.

Although O'Malley was only expected to continue until Nicholson had fully recovered, Nicholson's departure from the band saw the announcement that O'Malley would become a full member of the band. As he became a full-time member, he stated in an interview with Q TV that he had known the band prior to him joining them: "It never felt like such a big pressure thing."

Equipment

Basses
Fender Precision Bass (2006–present) - Used on "Do I Wanna Know"
Epiphone Jack Casady Signature Bass (2013–present) – Used on "Why'd You Only Call Me When You're High?"
Rickenbacker 3000 (2006–present)
Gretsch Broadkaster (2009)
Hofner 500/1 Bass (2018–present)
Burns Sonic Bass 1962 Reburst (2018–present)

Amps
Ashdown CTM-300  (2013–present)
Ampeg SVT-VR

Pedals
Skychord Truck Loud Overdrive
Electro-Harmonix Micro POG
Zvex Woolly Mammoth Fuzz

References

English rock bass guitarists
Male bass guitarists
Living people
Arctic Monkeys members
English people of Irish descent
Musicians from Sheffield
1985 births
21st-century English bass guitarists